Ryzen is a brand of multi-core x86-64 microprocessors designed and marketed by AMD for desktop, mobile, server, and embedded platforms based on the Zen microarchitecture. It consists of central processing units (CPUs) marketed for mainstream, enthusiast, server, and workstation segments and accelerated processing units (APUs) marketed for mainstream and entry-level segments and embedded systems applications.

AMD announced a new series of processors on December 13, 2016, named "Ryzen", and delivered them in Q1 2017, the first of several generations. The 1000 series featured up to eight cores and 16 threads, with a 52% instructions per cycle (IPC) increase over their prior CPU products. The second generation of Ryzen processors, the Ryzen 2000 series, released in April 2018, featured the Zen+ microarchitecture, a 12 nm process (GlobalFoundries); the aggregate performance increased 10% (of which approximately 3% was IPC, 6% was frequency); most importantly, Zen+ fixed the cache and memory latencies that had been major weak points (for latency-sensitive workloads, IPC gains of nearly ≈10%). The third generation of Ryzen processors launched on July 7, 2019, based on AMD's Zen 2 architecture, featuring significant design improvements with a 15% average IPC boost, a doubling of floating point capability to a full 256 bit wide execution datapath much like Intel's Haswell released in 2014, a shift to an MCM style "chiplet" based package design, and a further shrink to Taiwan Semiconductor Manufacturing Company's (TSMC) 7 nm fabrication process. On June 16, 2020, AMD announced new Ryzen 3000 series XT processors with 100 MHz higher boost clocks versus non XT processors. On October 8, 2020, AMD announced the Zen 3 architecture for their Ryzen 5000 series processors, featuring a 19% instructions per cycle (IPC) improvement over Zen 2, while being built on the same 7 nm TSMC node with out-of-the-box operating boost frequencies exceeding 5 GHz for the first time since AMD's Piledriver. With the launch of Zen 3 via the Ryzen 5000 series, AMD took the lead in gaming performance over Intel, particularly with single-threaded performance. This was followed by an unusually short stop-gap release of Ryzen 6000 mobile-only series processors on January 4, 2022, using the modestly changed Zen3+ core on a 6nm process by TSMC, with claims up to 15% performance uplift (typical 10% performance) gains (stated to be from frequency rather than IPC). Following this, the Ryzen 7000 series released on September 27, 2022, for desktops, featuring the new Zen4 core with a 13% uplift in IPC and 15% increase in frequency for a claimed nearly 30% in single thread performance. The Ryzen 7000 series features a brand new AM5 socket that only supports DDR5 SDRAM, unlike AMD's previous DDR3 sockets like AM2/+ and AM3/+ that offered DDR2 and DDR3 options and Intel's Alder Lake platforms that offer both DDR4 and DDR5 compatibility.

A majority of AMD's consumer Ryzen products use the Socket AM4 platform. In August 2017, AMD launched their Ryzen Threadripper line aimed at the enthusiast workstation market. AMD Ryzen Threadripper uses the larger TR4, sTRX4, and sWRX8 sockets, which support additional memory channels and PCI Express lanes. AMD has moved to the new Socket AM5 platform for consumer desktop Ryzen with the release of Zen 4 products in late 2022.

History 

Ryzen uses the "Zen" CPU microarchitecture, a complete original redesign by AMD that returned it to the high-end CPU market after a decade of near-total absence since 2006. AMD's primary competitor Intel had largely dominated this market segment starting from the 2006 release of their Core microarchitecture and the Core 2 Duo. Similarly, Intel had abandoned the Pentium 4, as its Netburst microarchitecture was uncompetitive with AMD's Athlon XP in terms of price and efficiency, and with Athlon 64 & 64 X2 they were outcompeted.  Even an upgraded version of the prior Pentium 3 continues to underpin Intel's CPU designs to this very day.

Until Ryzen's initial launch in 2017, Intel's market dominance over AMD would only continue to increase as simultaneously with the above top-to-bottom launch of the now famous "Intel Core" CPU lineup and branding, and the successful roll out of their well known "tick-tock" CPU release strategy. This brand new release strategy was most famous for alternating between a new CPU microarchitecture and a new fabrication node each and every year; with it becoming a release cadence Intel stuck to for almost an entire decade (specifically lasting from Intel Core's initial Q3 2006 launch with 65 nm Conroe, all the way until their 14 nm Broadwell desktop CPUs were delayed a year from a planned 2014 launch out to Q3 2015 instead. This necessitated a refresh of their pre-existing 22 nm Haswell CPU lineup in the form of "Devil's Canyon", and thus officially ended "tick-tock" as a practice). These events were incredibly important for AMD, as Intel's inability to further sustain "tick-tock" around 2014 would prove essential in providing both the initial and continually growing market openings for their Ryzen CPUs and the Zen CPU microarchitecture to succeed.

Also of note is the release of AMD's Bulldozer microarchitecture in 2011, which despite being a clean sheet CPU design like Zen, had been designed and optimized for parallel computing above all else; parallel computing was in its infancy, leading to starkly inferior real-world performance in any workload that was not highly threaded. This caused it to be uncompetitive in primarily every area outside of raw multithread performance and its use in low power APUs with integrated Radeon graphics. Despite a die shrink and several revisions of the Bulldozer architecture, performance and power efficiency failed to catch up with Intel's competing products. Consequently, all of this forced AMD to abandon the entire high-end CPU market (including desktop, laptops, and server/enterprise) until Ryzen's release in 2017.

Ryzen is the consumer-level implementation of the newer Zen microarchitecture, a complete redesign that marked the return of AMD to the high-end CPU market, offering a product stack able to compete with Intel at every level. Having more processing cores, Ryzen processors offer greater multi-threaded performance at the same price point relative to Intel's Core processors. The Zen architecture delivers more than 52% improvement in instructions per cycle (clock) over the prior-generation Bulldozer AMD core, without raising power use. The changes to instruction set also makes it binary-compatible with Intel's Broadwell, smoothing the transition for users.

Threadripper, which is geared for high performance desktops (HEDT), was not developed as part of a business plan or a specific roadmap; instead, a small enthusiast team inside AMD saw an opportunity that something could be developed between the Ryzen and Epyc CPU roadmaps that would put the crown of performance on AMD. After some progress was made in their spare time, the project was greenlit and put in an official roadmap by 2016.

Since the release of Ryzen, AMD's CPU market share has increased while Intel's appears to have stagnated and/or regressed.

Features

CPUs

APUs 
APU features table

Product lineup

Ryzen 1000

CPUs 
 Socket AM4 for Ryzen and Socket TR4 for Ryzen Threadripper.
 Based on first generation Zen. Ryzen CPUs based on Summit Ridge architecture. Threadripper based on Whitehaven architecture.
 4.8 billion transistors per 192 mm2 8-core "Zeppelin" die with one die being used for Ryzen and two for Ryzen Threadripper.
 Stepping: B1
 Memory support:
Ryzen dual-channel: DDR4–2666 ×2 single rank, DDR4–2400 ×2 dual rank, DDR4–2133 ×4 single rank, or DDR4–1866 ×4 dual rank.
Ryzen Threadripper quad-channel: DDR4–2666 ×4 single rank, DDR4–2400 ×4 dual rank, DDR4–2133 ×8 single rank, or DDR4–1866 ×8 dual rank.
 Instructions Sets: x87, MMX, SSE, SSE2, SSE3, SSSE3, SSE4.1, SSE4.2, AES, CLMUL, AVX, AVX2, FMA3, CVT16/F16C, ABM, BMI1, BMI2, SHA.
 All Ryzen-branded CPUs (except Pro variants) feature unlocked multipliers.
 AMD's SenseMI Technology monitors the processor continuously and uses Infinity Control Fabric to offer the following features:
 Pure Power reduces the entire ramp of processor voltage and clock speed, for light loads.
 Precision Boost increases the processor voltage and clock speed by 100–200 MHz if three or more cores are active (five or more, in the case of Threadripper, and by 300 MHz); and significantly further when less than three are active (less than five, in the case of Threadripper).
 XFR (eXtended Frequency Range) aims to maintain the average clock speed closer to the maximum Precision Boost, when sufficient cooling is available.
 Neural Net Prediction and Smart Prefetch use perceptron based neural branch prediction inside the processor to optimize instruction workflow and cache management.
 Ryzen launched in conjunction with a line of stock coolers for Socket AM4: the Wraith Stealth, Wraith Spire and Wraith Max. This line succeeds the original AMD Wraith cooler, which was released in mid-2016. The Wraith Stealth is a bundled low-profile unit meant for the lower-end CPUs with a rating for a TDP of 65 W, whereas the Wraith Spire is the bundled mainstream cooler with a TDP rating of 95 W, along with optional RGB lighting on certain models. The Wraith Max is a larger cooler incorporating heatpipes, rated at 140 W TDP.
 In December 2019, AMD started producing first generation Ryzen products built using the second generation Zen+ architecture. An example is the Ryzen 5 1600, with new batches having an "AF" identifier instead of its usual "AE", essentially being an underbinned Ryzen 5 2600 with the same specifications as the original Ryzen 5 1600.

Ryzen 2000

CPUs
The first Ryzen 2000 CPUs, based on the 12 nm Zen+ microarchitecture, were announced for preorder on April 13, 2018 and launched six days later.
Zen+ based Ryzen CPUs are based on Pinnacle Ridge architecture, while Threadripper CPUs are based on the Colfax microarchitecture. The first of the 2000 series of Ryzen Threadripper products, introducing Precision Boost Overdrive technology, followed in August. The Ryzen 7 2700X was bundled with the new Wraith Prism cooler.

APUs

Desktop 
In January 2018, AMD announced the first two Ryzen desktop APUs with integrated Radeon Vega graphics under the Raven Ridge codename. These were based on first generation Zen architecture. The Ryzen 3 2200G and the Ryzen 5 2400G were released in February.

Mobile 
In May 2017, AMD demonstrated a Ryzen mobile APU with four Zen CPU cores and Radeon Vega-based GPU. The first Ryzen mobile APUs, codenamed Raven Ridge, were officially released in October 2017.

 4.95 billion transistors on a 210 mm2 die, based on a modified 14 nm Zeppelin die where four of the cores are replaced by an integrated fifth-generation GCN-based GPU.
 Precision Boost 2
 16 external PCIe 3.0 lanes (four each to chipset and M.2 socket; eight to a PCIe slot). 16 internal PCIe 3.0 lanes for the integrated GPU and on-board input/output (I/O). In 2019, AMD released some new dual core Zen mobile parts branded as 300 or 3000, codenamed Dali.

Embedded

Great Horned Owl 
In February 2018, AMD announced the V1000 series of embedded Zen+ Vega APUs, based on the Great Horned Owl architecture, with four SKUs.

Banded Kestrel 
In April 2019, AMD announced another line of embedded Zen+Vega APUs, namely the Ryzen Embedded R1000 series with two SKUs.

Ryzen 3000

CPUs 
On May 27, 2019, at Computex in Taipei, AMD launched its third generation Ryzen processors which use AMD's Zen 2 architecture. For this generation's microarchitectures, Ryzen uses Matisse, while Threadripper uses Castle Peak. The chiplet design separates the CPU cores, fabricated on TSMC's 7FF process, and the I/O, fabricated on GlobalFoundries' 12LP process, and connects them via Infinity Fabric. The Ryzen 3000 series uses the AM4 socket similar to earlier models and is the first CPU to offer PCI Express 4.0 (PCIe) connectivity. The new architecture offers a 15% instruction-per-clock (IPC) uplift and a reduction in energy usage. Other improvements include a doubling of the L3 cache size, a re-optimized L1 instruction cache, a larger micro-operations cache, double the floating point performance, improved branch prediction, and better instruction pre-fetching. The 6-, 8- and 12-core CPUs became generally available on July 7, 2019, and 24-core processors were launched in November.

The Ryzen Threadripper 3990X, part of Castle Peak generation of CPUs, has currently the world's largest number of both cores and threads available in  - 64 and 128, respectively. The competing Intel Core i9-10980XE processor has only 18 cores and 36 threads. Another competitor, the workstation-oriented Intel Xeon W-3275 and W-3275M, has 28 cores, 56 threads, and cost more when launched.

The 4-, 6- and 8-core processors have one core chiplet. The 12- and 16-core processors have two core chiplets. In all cases the I/O die is the same.

The Threadripper 24- and 32-core processors have four core chiplets. The 64-core processor has eight core chiplets. All Threadripper processors use the same I/O die.

APUs 
Both mobile and desktop APUs are based on the Picasso microarchitecture, a 12 nm refresh of Raven Ridge, offering a modest (6%) increase in clock speeds (up to an additional 300 MHz maximum boost), Precision Boost 2, an up to 3% increase in IPC from the move to the Zen+ core with its reduced cache and memory latencies, and newly added solder thermal interface material for the desktop parts. Fabricated at GlobalFoundries, This gives the Ryzen 12nm (Zen+ refresh) from the "original" 14nm Zen cores initially released in 2017 an aggregate 10% performance uplift going from 14nm to 12nm.

Desktop

Mobile 
In 2019, AMD first released the Ryzen 3000 APUs, consisting only of quad core parts. Then in January 2020, they announced value dual core mobile parts, codenamed Dalí, including the Ryzen 3 3250U.

Ryzen 4000

CPUs 
In April 2022, AMD launched the Ryzen 4000 series of CPUs for budget-oriented users. Unlike the Ryzen 3000 series CPUs which are based on "Matisse" cores, these new Ryzen 4000 series desktop CPUs were based on "Renoir" cores and are essentially APUs with the integrated graphics disabled.

APUs 
The Ryzen 4000 APUs are based on Renoir, a refresh of the Zen 2 Matisse CPU cores, coupled with Radeon Vega GPU cores. They were released only to OEM manufacturers in mid-2020. Unlike Matisse, Renoir does not support PCIe 4.0.

Ryzen Pro 4x50G APUs are the same as 4x00G APUs, except they are bundled a Wraith Stealth cooler and are not OEM-only. It is possible this is a listing mistake, since 4x50G CPUs are unavailable on retail (as of Oct. 2020) and PRO SKUs are usually the OEM only parts.

Desktop

Mobile 
Zen 2 APUs, based on the 7 nm Renoir microarchitecture, commercialized as Ryzen 4000.

Embedded

Grey Hawk 
In November 2020, AMD announced the V2000 series of embedded Zen 2 Vega APUs.

Ryzen 5000

CPUs 
The desktop Ryzen 5000 series, based on the Zen 3 microarchitecture, was announced on October 8, 2020. They use the same 7 nm manufacturing process, which has matured slightly. Mainstream Ryzen 5000 CPUs are codenamed Vermeer. Enthusiast/workstation Threadripper 5000 CPUs are codenamed Chagall, initially named Ryzen Threadripper 4000 under the codename Genesis.

APUs 
In contrast to their CPU counterparts, the APUs consist of single dies with integrated graphics and smaller caches. The APUs, codenamed Cezanne, forgo PCIe 4.0 support to keep power consumption low.

Desktop

Mobile 
The 5000 series includes models based on the Zen 2 (code name Lucienne) and Zen 3 (code name Cezanne) microarchitectures. HX models are unlocked, allowing them to be overclocked if the host device manufacturer has exposed that functionality. SMT is now standard across the lineup unlike the 4000-series Ryzen Mobile.

Ryzen 6000

APUs

Mobile
At CES 2022 AMD announced the Ryzen 6000 mobile series. It is based on the Zen 3+ (code name Rembrandt) architecture, which is Zen 3 on 6nm. Other noteworthy upgrades are RDNA2 based graphics, PCIe 4.0 and DDR5/LPDDR5 support. Ryzen PRO versions of the these processors were announced on April 19, 2022 and use a 6x50 naming scheme.

Ryzen 7000

CPUs

Desktop

In May 2022, AMD revealed its roadmap showing the Ryzen 7000 series of processors for release later that year, to be based on the Zen 4 architecture in 5 nm. Included are DDR5 and PCIe 5.0 support as well as the change to the new AM5 socket. On May 23, 2022, at AMD's Computex keynote, AMD officially announced the Ryzen 7000 to be released in Fall 2022, showing a 16-core CPU reaching boost speeds of 5.5 GHz and claiming a 15% increase in single-thread performance. The initial four models of the Ryzen 7000 series, ranging from Ryzen 5 to Ryzen 9, were launched on September 27, 2022.

The L2 cache per core is doubled to 1 MB from Zen 3. The I/O die has moved from a 12 nm process to 6 nm and incorporates an integrated RDNA 2 GPU on all Ryzen 7000 models, as well as DDR5 and PCIe 5.0 support. DDR4 RAM is not supported on Ryzen 7000. According to Gamers Nexus, AMD said that the RDNA GPU was intended for diagnostic and office purposes without using a discrete GPU and not for gaming. The operating power of AM5 is increased to 170 W from AM4's 105 W, with the absolute maximum power draw or "Power Package Tracking" (PPT) being 230 W.

Mobile
At CES 2023 AMD announced the Ryzen 7000 mobile series. The lineup features 5 different product families with CPU designs based on Zen 2 (7020 series), Zen 3 (7030 series), Zen 3+ (7035 series) & Zen 4 (7040 and 7045 series), and GPU designs based on Vega (7030 series), RDNA2 (7020, 7035 and 7045 series) & RDNA3 (7040 series). At top of this range is the 7045 series (codename “Dragon Range”), based on Zen 4. It is based on the same chiplet architecture as the desktop line-up with 2 CCDs and 1 I/O die. This results in a doubling of the core count compared to the previous generation.

APUs

Mobile

Initial reception 
The first Ryzen 7 (1700, 1700X, and 1800X) processors debuted in early March 2017 and were generally well received by hardware reviewers. Ryzen was the first brand new architecture from AMD in five years, and without very much initial fine-tuning or optimization, it ran generally well for reviewers. Initial Ryzen chips ran well with software and games already on the market, performing exceptionally well in workstation scenarios, and well in most gaming scenarios. Compared to Piledriver-powered FX chips, Zen-powered Ryzen chips ran cooler, much faster, and used less power. IPC uplift was eventually gauged to be 52% higher than Excavator, which was two full generations ahead of the architecture still being used in AMD's FX-series desktop predecessors like the FX-8350 and FX-8370. Though Zen fell short of Intel's Kaby Lake in terms of IPC, and therefore single-threaded throughput, it compensated by offering more cores to applications that can use them. Power consumption and heat emission were found to be competitive with Intel, and the included Wraith coolers were generally competitive with higher-priced aftermarket units.

Ryzen 1800X's multi-threaded performance, in some cases while using Blender or other open-source software, was around four times the performance of the FX-8370, or nearly double that of the i7 7700K. One reviewer found that Ryzen chips would usually outperform competing Intel i7 processors for a fraction of the price when all eight cores are used.

However, one complaint among a subset of reviewers was that Ryzen processors lagged behind their Intel counterparts when running older games, or some newer games at mainstream resolutions such as 720p or 1080p. AMD acknowledged the gaming performance deficit at low resolutions during a Reddit "Ask Me Anything" thread, where it explained that updates and patches were being developed. Subsequent updates to Ashes of the Singularity: Escalation and Rise of the Tomb Raider increased frame rates by 17–31% on Ryzen systems. In April 2017, developer id Software announced that, in the future, its games would exploit the greater parallelism available on Ryzen CPUs.

It has been suggested that low threaded applications often result in Ryzen processors being underused, yielding lower than expected benchmark scores, because Zen relies on its core count to make up for its lower IPC rating than that of Kaby Lake. However, AMD and others have argued thread scheduling is not the fundamental issue to Windows 10 performance. Early AM4 motherboards were also hindered by BIOS bugs and poor DDR4 memory support.

Operating system support

Windows 
AMD verified that computers with Ryzen CPUs can boot Windows 7 and Windows 8 both 64- and 32-bit but on newer hardware, including AMD Ryzen and Intel Kaby Lake and later, Microsoft only officially supports the use of Windows 10. Windows Update blocks updates from being installed on newer systems running older versions of Windows, though that restriction can be circumvented with an unofficial patch. Windows 11 is only officially supported on Ryzen APUs and CPUs using Zen+ architecture or newer; systems running Zen architecture-based CPUs or APUs are not entitled to receive updates.

Although AMD initially announced that Ryzen chipset drivers would not be provided for Windows 7, its chipset driver packages do in fact list and include them.

Linux 
Full support for Ryzen processors' performance features in Linux requires kernel version 4.10 or newer.

Known issues

Spectre 
Like nearly all modern high performance microprocessors, Ryzen was susceptible to the "Spectre" vulnerabilities. The vulnerabilities can be mitigated without hardware changes via microcode updates and operating system workarounds, but the mitigations incur a performance penalty. AMD Ryzen and Epyc suffer up to 20% penalty from the mitigations, depending on workload, comparing favorably with a penalty of in some benchmarks up to 30% for Intel Core and Xeon processors, in part as a result of the AMD processors not requiring mitigation against the related Meltdown vulnerability.

Launched in 2019, Zen 2 includes hardware mitigations against the Spectre V4 speculative store bypass vulnerability.

Segmentation fault 
Some early shipments of Ryzen 1000 series processors produced segmentation faults on some workloads on Linux, especially while compiling code with GNU Compiler Collection (GCC). AMD offered to replace the affected processors with newer ones that are unaffected by the problem.

Alleged issues by CTS Labs 
In early 2018, Israeli computer security consultancy firm CTS Labs stated that they had discovered several major flaws in the Ryzen components ecosystem, publicly disclosing them after giving AMD 24 hours to respond and raising concerns and questions regarding their legitimacy, though they were later confirmed by two separate security firms. AMD has since stated that while the flaws are real and will be fixed via microcode updates, their severity was overstated as physical access to the hardware is required to exploit the flaws.

See also 
 AMD Accelerated Processing Unit
 List of AMD processors
 List of AMD Athlon processors
 List of AMD Epyc processors
 List of AMD FX processors
 List of AMD Opteron processors
 List of AMD Phenom processors
 List of AMD Ryzen processors

References

External links 
 
 Ryzen 5 vs Intel Core i5

AMD x86 microprocessors
Computer-related introductions in 2017